Mustametsa may refer to several places in Estonia:

Mustametsa, Harju County, village in Kuusalu Parish, Harju County
Mustametsa, Tartu County, village in Vara Parish, Tartu County